La Cabrera is a municipality in central Spain, around  away from Madrid. La Cabrera belongs to the comarca called Sierra Norte de Madrid which is part of the wider autonomous Community of Madrid. 

European route E-05 runs through the town, following the old N-I radial road connecting Madrid to Irun and France (later split into the A-1). 

La Cabrera is characterised by its mountainous topography with the prominent La Cabrera mountain range forming a natural limit to the North. Although most of the mountain range is in La Cabrera, it also reaches the neighbouring municipalities of Valdemanco and Lozoyuela. 

The landscape is formed by a granite massif of Palaeozoic origin. Its main features include the summits of Cancho Gordo, Pico del Miel and Cerro de La Cabeza, as well as natural springs and streams, including the Alfrecho stream which feeds the Jarama River. 

Among its flora are the trees and thickets of the southern slopes, such as: Pyrenean Oak, Holm Oak, Poplar, Willow, and Pink Rockrose.

Buses  

 191: Buitrago - Madrid (Plaza de Castilla)

 193: El Vellón - Pedrezuela - Madrid (Plaza de Castilla)

 194: Rascafría - Madrid (Plaza de Castilla)

 195: Braojos - Madrid (Plaza de Castilla)

 196: La Acebeda - Madrid (Plaza de Castilla) (only at weekends)

 197B: Torrelaguna - El Berrueco - La Cabrera - Valdemanco

 197C: Torrelaguna - Venturada - Cabanillas

 725: Valdemanco - Bustarviejo - Miraflores - Madrid (Plaza de Castilla) (2 daily trips)

References

External links

Municipalities in the Community of Madrid